The Texas Tech Shackleton Glacier Expedition took place first from 1962/63 and then again from 1964/65. The expedition, led by F. Alton Wade, was sponsored by Texas Technological College (now Texas Tech University). It explored areas of Antarctica.

Exploration
Areas explored during and named by the expedition include:
Matador Mountain– Named in honor of the Texas Tech student body, which was originally known as the Matadors.
Red Raider Rampart– Named in honor of the Texas Tech student body, which is now known as the Red Raiders.
Shanklin Glacier– Named in honor of CWO David M. Shanklin, USA, of the U.S. Army Aviation Detachment which supported the expedition.
Ringed Nunatak, named for the ring of moraine that completely surrounds the nunatak.
Shenk Peak– Named in honor of John C. Shenk, who was a Texas Tech graduate student and member of the expedition.
Simplicity Hill– Named because of the ease with which they were able to approach the feature, and because of the relative simplicity of its geologic nature.
Yeats Glacier– Named for Vestal L. "Pappy" Yeats, a Texas Tech faculty member and participant in the expedition in both 1962/63 and 1964/65.

References

External links
 Antarctic Collections of the Paleontology Division at the Museum of Texas Tech University (lower portion of page)
 Yeats recalls South Pole expeditions, war, Depressions and teaching at Tech, Lubbock Avalanche-Journal, October 28, 2008

Texas Tech University
Antarctic expeditions
United States and the Antarctic
1962 in Antarctica
1963 in Antarctica
1964 in Antarctica
1965 in Antarctica
Expeditions from the United States
History of the Ross Dependency